Below is a list of museums in Uganda.

A-B
Ankole cultural drama actor's museum
Attitude change museum
Bamasaaba Cultural Union
Bulemba Museum
Bukonzo Cultural Association Museum
Bunyoro Community Historical Museum Associates
Busoga Cultural Museum
Butambala heritage center of Civilization
Batwa Cultural Experience- Museum trail

C-G
Cultural Research centre Museum-Jinja
Charles Nyonyintono Kikonyogo Money Museum
Gakondo Cultural Museum
Ebirungi Ebyeira Museum-Jinja

H-I
Ham Mukasa Museum
Igongo Cultural Centre
Iteso Cultural union Museum

K-N
Karamoja Regional Museum
Kabale Regional Museum
Kigulu Cultural Museum-Iganga
Mountain of the Moon-Fort Portal
Mt. Elgon Museum of History and Culture-Mbale
Nyamyarro Museum
Obudingiya Bwa Bamba (OBB)

O - T 

 Ssemagulu Royal Museum

The Ik House of Memory

Ker Kwong Museum - Alur

U-Z
Uganda Museum
Uganda Marty's University Museum
Social Innovation Museum
Soroti Regional Museum
St.Luke Community Museum
Zoological Museum at Makerere University

See also
 uganda Islamic Museum and Research centre

External links
 Brochure of all museums in Uganda
 Museums and Monuments in Uganda
 Museums in Uganda
 Social Innovation Museum

Uganda
Museums
Lists of tourist attractions in Uganda
Uganda
Museums